Sure-Tan, Inc. v. National Labor Relations Board, 467 U.S. 883 (1984) is a US labor law case that resulted in a split decision before the US Supreme Court. By a 7-2 majority, the Court ruled that undocumented immigrant workers were “employees” covered by the National Labor Relations Act (NLRA). However, by a 5-4 majority the Court ruled that the National Labor Relations Board (NLRB) was limited in its remedies for penalizing employers who fired undocumented workers for union organizing in violation of the NLRA. The decision was one of a series limiting the rights of immigrant workers and the power of the NLRB culminating with Hoffman Plastic Compounds, Inc. v. NLRB.

Sure-Tan, Inc. was a small leather processing company in Chicago, Illinois. Workers at the company, several of whom were undocumented immigrants from Mexico, voted to unionize in late 1976. After the NLRB’s certification of the election in January 1977, the company’s owner wrote to the Immigration and Naturalization Service (INS) and named five union supporters who might be undocumented. The company also fired non-immigrant employees who were union supporters. In February 1977, the INS raided the firm and deported the five workers. The NLRB found its company to have violated the workers' right to organize. The Board ordered the company to rehire the workers and pay back pay for the lost work from the date of their arrest by the INS. 

Justice O’Connor delivered the decision for the US Supreme Court and ruled that undocumented workers were fully covered by the NLRA, but reinstatement and back pay could not be assessed because the workers, who had been deported to Mexico and were unavailable for work. Justices Brennan, Marshall, Blackmun, and Stevens concurred that undocumented workers are employees under the NLRA but dissented from back pay portion of the decision by arguing that the NLRB had acted properly. Justices Powell and Rehnquist dissented from the opinion that undocumented workers are employees under the NLRA but concurred with the decision to deny back pay to deported undocumented workers.

References

External links
 
 NLRB v. Sure-Tan, Inc., U.S. Court of Appeals 7th Circuit (1978)

United States Supreme Court cases

National Labor Relations Board litigation
United States Supreme Court cases of the Burger Court
1984 in United States case law
United States labor case law
Immigration case law